Kathleen Mary 'Kate' Nunneley (16 September 1872 – 28 September 1956) was a New Zealand tennis player and librarian. She was the best woman tennis player in New Zealand in the late 1800s and early 1900s, and possibly still the best New Zealand woman player ever.

Early life and career
Kathleen Nunneley was born in Little Bowden, Leicestershire, England  on 16 September 1872, the daughter of John Nunneley, a wholesale grocer, and Kate Young. Her father committed suicide in 1893 and she emigrated to New Zealand with her mother and siblings in 1894 where she joined the Thorndon Lawn Tennis Club in Wellington.

She won the national singles title 13 times in a row from 1895 to 1907, winning in total 32 national titles. She defeated Blanche Hillyard the Wimbledon champion, and won two mixed doubles titles with Anthony Wilding; unfortunately there were fewer opportunities at Wimbledon for women players.

In May 1896 Nunneley won the singles title at the New South Wales Championships in Sydney, defeating Mabel Shaw in the final. The following year she lost her title in the challenge round to Phoebe Howlitt.

Nunneley worked as a librarian for 30 years, retiring from her position as assistant in charge of the reference department at the Wellington Public Library in 1935.

She had her tennis gold medals made into a trophy for interprovincial women's tennis, the Nunneley Casket. She was inducted into the New Zealand Sports Hall of Fame in 1995.

References

Sources 
 Profiles of Fame: The stories of New Zealand's Greatest Sporting Achievers by Ron Palenski (2002, New Zealand Sports Hall of Fame, Dunedin) 

1872 births
1956 deaths
New Zealand female tennis players
New Zealand librarians
Women librarians
English emigrants to New Zealand
Tennis people from Leicestershire